Francis Perret (born 15 October 1935) is a Swiss ski jumper. He competed in the individual event at the 1956 Winter Olympics.

References

1935 births
Living people
Swiss male ski jumpers
Olympic ski jumpers of Switzerland
Ski jumpers at the 1956 Winter Olympics
Place of birth missing (living people)